Radłów  is a town in Tarnów County, Lesser Poland Voivodeship, in southern Poland. It is the seat of the gmina (administrative district) called Gmina Radłów.

The town has a population of 2,800. It gained the status of a town on 1 January 2010.

It has three schools and a park.

History
The first historical notes mentioning Radłów can be found in the Cracow Cathedral Code (1080), when a parish was established in Radłów. In 1241 the church was destroyed by Tatars. A new church was erected only in 1337 and modernized in the 17th century. In 1655, the area was ravaged by Swedish troops when a major battle of the Second Northern War took place near Radłów. Two years later, the Hungarian army devastated the town again.

Radłów was often threatened or partly destroyed by the floods of the Dunajec (1270, 1468, 1533, 1844, 1903, 1934).

After the First Partition of Poland (1772), the town belonged to the Austrian Empire, later to the Austro-Hungarian Monarchy. The second half of the 19th century saw an increased emigration to Germany and the United States. In the first battles of the First World War 1914, the whole region was heavily destroyed. 1918 Radłów became part of the Second Polish Republic.

References

External links
 Jewish Community in Radłów on Virtual Shtetl

Cities and towns in Lesser Poland Voivodeship
Tarnów County
Populated places in the Kingdom of Galicia and Lodomeria
Kraków Voivodeship (1919–1939)